Malahide United F.C. are a football club from Malahide, Fingal county in Ireland. The club plays at Gannon Park. Malahide compete in the Leinster Senior League.

History
The club was established in 1944. However, it disbanded for a period before reforming in 1971. With over 1,200 registered players (as of 2009), the club claims to be one of the largest in Ireland.

Malahide United won the Charlie Cahill Cup on 31 March 2019, beating Crumlin United 5-3 on Penalties (0-0 after Full-time, and 1-1 after AET). The final took place in Home Farm's Whitehall Stadium.

In April 2019, Malahide beat UCC in the qualifying round of the 2019 FAI Cup in a game played at the Mardyke stadium. Malahide were knocked out of the competition in the next round by Crumlin United F.C.

Colours
The club's colours include: red and black striped shirts, black shorts and black socks. The away kit has: all white shirts, white shorts and white socks.

Former Players
Rene Gilmartin

Conor Sammon

Zachary Elbouzedi 

Conor Grant 

Oisin McEntee

Peter Kioso

Lee Desmond

References

External links
 

 
Association football clubs established in 1944
Malahide
Leinster Senior League (association football) clubs
Association football clubs in Fingal
1944 establishments in Ireland